Hinman Glacier was a glacier that flowed to the north and northwest from near the summit of Mount Hinman, in the U.S. state of Washington. Hinman Glacier was within the Alpine Lakes Wilderness of Snoqualmie National Forest. Smaller glaciers in this part of the Cascade Range preceded the Hinman Glacier in disappearing as part of the retreat of glaciers since 1850 with only three glaciers remaining in King County.

Made up of two sections, the western lobe was the first to disappear, leaving only small patches of ice by 2009. The glacier persisted on the north flank of Mount Hinman for another decade and repeat photography showed rapid retreat. A new lake, Hinman Lake, formed behind the terminal moraine during the second half of the 20th Century as the ice receded. The decline of glacial ice in this portion of the Cascades has led to negative impacts on streamflow in the Skykomish River that drains into the Puget Sound near Everett by providing less dependable late-summer waterflow that can harm aquatic life in the river.

Evidence suggests that Hinman Glacier may have formed as early as the retreat of the Cordilleran ice sheet, which covered the region approximately 14,000 years ago, with it being at least as old as the Mount Mazama eruption 7,000 years ago that created Crater Lake in Oregon.

See also
List of glaciers in the United States

References

Glaciers of the North Cascades
Glaciers of King County, Washington
Glaciers of Washington (state)